The hexagonal bifrustum or truncated hexagonal bipyramid is the fourth in an infinite series of bifrustum polyhedra. It has 12 trapezoid and 2 hexagonal faces.
This polyhedron can be constructed by taking a hexagonal dipyramid and truncating the polar axis vertices, making it into two end-to-end frustums.

Several types of crystal take this shape.
It has also been used in the design of 14-sided dice, which may be used to generate randomly chosen playing cards.  It also has application in novelty promotional calendars: one month can appear on each of the trapezoids, and an advertising or other message on each of the hexagons.

References

External links 
Conway Notation for Polyhedra Try: t6dP6

Polyhedra